Glutaric acid is the organic compound with the formula C3H6(COOH)2. Although the related "linear" dicarboxylic acids adipic and succinic acids are water-soluble only to a few percent at room temperature, the water-solubility of glutaric acid is over 50% (w/w).

Biochemistry
Glutaric acid is naturally produced in the body during the metabolism of some amino acids, including lysine and tryptophan. Defects in this metabolic pathway can lead to a disorder called glutaric aciduria, where toxic byproducts build up and can cause severe encephalopathy.

Production
Glutaric acid can be prepared by the ring-opening of butyrolactone with potassium cyanide to give the mixed potassium carboxylate-nitrile that is hydrolyzed to the diacid. Alternatively hydrolysis, followed by oxidation of dihydropyran gives glutaric acid. It can also be prepared from reacting 1,3-dibromopropane with sodium or potassium cyanide to obtain the dinitrile, followed by hydrolysis.

Uses
 1,5-Pentanediol, a common plasticizer and precursor to polyesters is manufactured by hydrogenation of glutaric acid and its derivatives.
 Glutaric acid itself has been used in the production of polymers such as polyester polyols, polyamides. The odd number of carbon atoms (i.e. 5) is useful in decreasing polymer elasticity.
 Pyrogallol can be produced from glutaric diester.

Safety
Glutaric acid may cause irritation to the skin and eyes. Acute hazards include the fact that this compound may be harmful by ingestion, inhalation or skin absorption.

References

External links
 Calculator: Water and solute activities in aqueous glutaric acid

Dicarboxylic acids